Astrid Kvalbein (born 13 October 1971 in Oslo) is a Norwegian soprano, classical music critic and musicologist, and the rector (i.e. president) of the Norwegian Academy of Music, serving since 2021.

Career
Kvalbein was born in Oslo and is the daughter of the theologian Hans Kvalbein. She is both a performer and an academic musicologist. She earned her doctorate in musicology at the Norwegian Academy of Music in 2013 with a dissertation examining the work of Pauline Hall (1890–1969) as a classical composer, and subsequently worked as a senior researcher at the institution until her 2021 election as its rector, its highest office.

She is well known as the long-time classical music critic of Norway's two largest newspapers, Aftenposten and Verdens Gang. 

As a performer Kvalbein has been a member of contemporary and avant-garde music groups Søyr, vonDrei (with Solveig Slettahjell and Ellen Aagaard) and asamisimasa.

Awards
Gender Equality Award of the Norwegian Association of Composers (2018)

References

Norwegian musicologists
Norwegian music critics
Norwegian women critics
Norwegian women non-fiction writers
20th-century Norwegian women singers
20th-century Norwegian singers
1971 births
Living people
21st-century Norwegian women singers
21st-century Norwegian singers